Mulakalacheruvu is a village in Annamayya district of the Indian state of Andhra Pradesh. It is the mandal headquarters of Mulakalacheruvu mandal.

References 

Villages in Annamayya district
Mandal headquarters in Annamayya district